Lockwood is a town in the City of Greater Bendigo, with a small section in Mount Alexander Shire. Lockwood south is in the Lockwood Ward of the Greater Bendigo municipality.

History 
The first school was opened in 1859 and a Wesleyan Church was built in 1872 which is now a Uniting Church. A public hall was built in the late nineteenth century and is still in use today.

References 

Suburbs of Bendigo
Towns in Victoria (Australia)
Bendigo